Majagua is a municipality and town in the Ciego de Ávila Province of Cuba. It is located in the eastern part of the province, and is bisected by the Carretera Central highway.

Geography
In addition to the main town, the municipality includes the villages of Guayacanes, Jicotea, Las Coloradas, and La Calera.

Demographics
In 2004, the municipality of Majagua had a population of 26,617.

See also
Majagua Municipal Museum
Municipalities of Cuba
List of cities in Cuba

References

External links

Populated places in Ciego de Ávila Province